is a scrolling shooter arcade video game developed by TOSE. It was released by SNK in Japan and Europe in 1981, and licensed to Centuri for manufacture in North America in October and to Zaccaria in Italy the same year. Cinematronics converted the game to cocktail arcade cabinets in North America. The player flies a ship through forced-scrolling tunnels with sections that move horizontally, vertically, or diagonally, to reach a boss at the end. The ship is controlled with an 8-way joystick, and it can fire in four directions via four buttons in a diamond arrangement.

Atari, Inc. released a port for their Atari 2600 console in 1982 and the Atari 5200 in 1983. Vanguard II, an arcade sequel with top-down, multidirectional scrolling, and gameplay similar to Time Pilot '84, remained obscure.

Plot
The Gond has been terrorizing nearby space colonies with its periodic raids of destruction. The time has come to put an end to his reign of terror. The player has been selected to pilot an advanced fighter ship with high offensive capabilities, and must enter the cave inside the asteroid where the Gond makes his home, and safely fly through every zone; the Mountain Zone, Rainbow Zone, Styx Zone, Stripe Zone, Bleak Zone, and the City of Mystery (aka Last Zone) where the Gond is rumored to reside. The player must take the Gond out, and succeed in the mission. If unsuccessful, the colonies will be doomed.

Gameplay
Vanguard is similar to Scramble, in that the player controls a ship which automatically flies forward through scrolling levels. It has a limited amount of fuel that constantly depletes. Unlike Scramble, fuel is replenished by destroying enemies, so running out of fuel is less common. Some portions of Vanguard scroll vertically, horizontally or diagonally.

The ship can fire lasers independently in any of the four cardinal directions using the four buttons. Flying into an energy pod makes the ship invulnerable for a short while, allowing both enemy ships and the tunnel walls to be destroyed by ramming.

The game is divided into two tunnels of multiple zones each. The first tunnel consists of Mountain Zone, Rainbow Zone, Styx Zone, Rainbow Zone 2, Stripe Zone, Rainbow Zone 3, Bleak Zone, and the City of Mystery/Last Zone. The second tunnel consists of Mountain Zone, Stripe Zone, Styx Zone, Rainbow Zone, Bleak Zone, and the City of Mystery/Last Zone. At the end of each tunnel the player must defeat a boss guarded by two moving force fields with holes in them.

Vanguard uses a number of custom sound chips to produce digitized voices and custom synthesizer sounds. The speech is used to announce the name of the current zone or the next zone that is about to be entered, or the words "be careful" when a power-up is about to end. Theme music composed by Jerry Goldsmith for the 1979 sci-fi film Star Trek: The Motion Picture, later utilized for Star Trek: The Next Generation, is borrowed as Vanguard's introductory theme. Vultan's theme (composed by Queen's Freddie Mercury) from the 1980 movie Flash Gordon is used as the sound effect when a power-up is attained.

Ports
Atari, Inc. released ports of Vanguard for the Atari 2600 in 1982 and the Atari 5200 in 1983. The Atari 2600 version was programmed by Dave Payne.

Reception
Vanguard was the top-grossing video game on the US Play Meter arcade charts in December 1981. The Atari 2600 version of Vanguard was the 21st best-selling Atari cartridge of all time.

The Atari 2600 version of Vanguard was reviewed by Video magazine in its "Arcade Alley" column where it was described as "a marvelous home-arcade translation" of the original arcade version. Reviewers commented that in contrast to some of Atari's other less-successful efforts with licensed titles, the "anonymous Atari designer made elegant simplifications in the graphics" that faithfully evoke the look and "the same breathtaking action" of the original. Note was also made of the fact that this version of Vanguard marked the first time a continued play option was offered in a game cartridge.

The Atari 5200 version was rated B+ by Raymond Dimetrosky of Video Games Player magazine, stating that it is "a lot of fun" but has worse controls than the Atari VCS version. The 5200 version was awarded the "1984 Best Science Fiction/Fantasy Videogame" at the 5th annual Arkie Awards, where judges described it as "a scrolling shootout extravaganza" and praised its "outstanding graphics". Computer Games magazine reviewed the Atari versions, praising the Atari computer and VCS versions for "great shooting action" while stating the 5200 version "looks good but plays bad".

Legacy
Vanguard was followed by a less successful arcade sequel in 1984, Vanguard II, which has top-down gameplay similar to that of Time Pilot '84. Game Machine listed the sequel on their May 1, 1984 issue as being the twenty-second most-successful table arcade unit of the month.

NXIVM cult leader Keith Raniere, who enjoyed playing this game, used "Vanguard" as his title within the organization.

See also
 Scramble
 Cosmic Avenger
 Super Cobra

References

External links
 
 Vanguard at the Centuri.net Arcade Database
  Vanguard at arcade-history
 Vanguard for the Atari 2600 at Atari Mania

1981 video games
Arcade video games
Atari 2600 games
Atari 5200 games
Scrolling shooters
SNK franchises
SNK games
Tose (company) games
Video games developed in Japan
Single-player video games